The Bint Jbeil District is a district in the Nabatiyeh Governorate of Lebanon. The capital of the district is Bint Jbeil.

Villages
The following 36 municipalities are all located in the Bint Jbeil District:

Aynata
Aayta Ech Chaab
Aayta Ej Jabal (Zott)
Ain Ebel
Aaytaroun
At Tiri
Baraachit
Beit Lif
Beit Yahoun
Bent Jbayl
Borj Qalaouiyeh
Chaqra
Debl
Deir Ntar
Froun
Ghandouriyeh
Haddatha
Hanine
Hariss
Jmaijmeh
Kafra
Kfar Dounine
Khirbet Selm
Kounine
Maroun Er Ras
Qalaouiyeh
Qaouzah
Rachaf
Ramiyeh (Bent Jbayl)
Rmaych
Safad El Battikh
Salhana
Soultaniyeh
Srobbine
Tibnine
Yaroun
Yater

 
Districts of Lebanon